Guandong may refer to:

Guandong or Kwantung (關東), a historical name for Manchuria, i.e. "east of Shanhai Pass"
Kwantung Leased Territory, a small section of the above region controlled by Russia and, then, Japan from 1898 to 1945
Guandong (關東), a historical name for North China Plain, i.e. "east of Tong Pass"

Towns
Guandong, Guangxi (官垌), a town in Pubei County, Guangxi, China
Guandong, Guizhou (贯洞), a town in Congjiang County, Guizhou, China

See also
Guangdong, a coastal province in South China